The 2018 Central Pulse season saw the Central Pulse netball team compete in the 2018 ANZ Premiership and the 2018 Netball New Zealand Super Club. With a team coached by Yvette McCausland-Durie, captained by Katrina Grant and featuring Karin Burger, Aliyah Dunn, Ameliaranne Ekenasio, Sulu Fitzpatrick and Claire Kersten, Central Pulse finished the regular season as minor premiers. However, in the grand final Southern Steel defeated Pulse 54–53. However, Pulse subsequently won the 2018 Netball New Zealand Super Club tournament, defeating Mainland Tactix 61–56 in the final.

Players

Player movements

2018 roster

  

 

Notes
  Four Central Zone players, Maddy Gordon, Paris Lokotui, Elle Temu and Saviour Tui were added to the squad for the 2018 Netball New Zealand Super Club.

Pre-season
Pulse hosted the official ANZ Premiership pre-season tournament at Te Wānanga o Raukawa in Otaki between 20 and 22 April.

ANZ Premiership regular season

Fixtures and results
Round 1

Round 2

Round 3

Round 4

Round 5

Round 6

Round 7

Round 8

Round 9

Round 10

Round 11

Round 12

Round 13

Final standings

ANZ Premiership Finals Series

Grand final

Netball New Zealand Super Club

Group stage

Final ladder

1st/4th Play offs
Semi-finals

Final

National Netball League
With a team featuring Saviour Tui and Ainsleyana Puleiata, Pulse's reserve team, Central Zone won the 2018 National Netball League title after defeating Waikato Bay of Plenty 62–53 in the grand final.

Award winners

New Zealand Netball Awards

Team of the season
Three Central Pulse players were named in Brendon Egan's Stuff Seven team of the season.

References

2018
2018 ANZ Premiership season
2018 in New Zealand netball